The Board of Education Act 1899 was an Act of the Parliament of the United Kingdom concerning education.

The act created the Board of Education to replace the previous Education and Science and Art departments. The Board acted as a central authority for education in the United Kingdom. As part of its responsibilities, it was empowered to create a register of teachers.

References

United Kingdom Education Acts
United Kingdom Acts of Parliament 1899
1899 in education